Badminton at the 2005 Southeast Asian Games was held at the PhilSports Arena (formerly ULTRA Arena) at the Philippine Sports Commission Complex in Pasig, Philippines. Participants competed for 5 gold medals in the individual events and 2 gold medals in the team events.

Medal table

Medalists

Men's singles

Women's singles

Men's doubles

Women's doubles

Mixed doubles

Men's team

Quarter-finals

Semi-finals

Final

Women's team

Quarter-finals

Semi-finals

Final

References

External links
Southeast Asian Games Official Results

2005 Southeast Asian Games events
2005 Southeast Asian Games
Southeast Asian Games
Badminton tournaments in the Philippines